The qualification for the 2023 BAL season, also known as Road to BAL 2023, was the 3rd edition of the qualifying tournaments for the Basketball Africa League. The tournaments were organised by FIBA Africa and are held from 10 October to 27 November 2022. The format was similar to the previous two seasons, with a group phase and an elite 16 being held.

Team allocation 
On 21 September 2021, FIBA Africa announced the teams in the qualifying tournaments as well as the six countries that would qualify directly.

 1st, 2nd, 3rd, etc.: standings in the domestic league
 BAL: Qualified as team that was directly qualified in the 2022 BAL season
 QS: Teams from a country that qualified for the 2022 BAL season through the qualifying tournaments
 WC: Wild card

Withdrawing teams 
Nine teams were drawn in a group for the group phase, but withdrew prior to the start of the games.

Group phase

Group A 
The group was initially set to feature six teams, including the champions from Cape Verde and the Reformers of Prisons from Ghana. The Reformers of Prisons withdrew, leaving four teams in the group. The games of Group A are held in Niamey, Niger, and are played from 18 October to 23 October.

Group B 
Tempo BC from Chad withdrew. Vita Club from the DR Congo withdrew due to the lack of financial means.

The games of Group B were held in Yaoundé, Cameroon, and were played from 11 October to 16 October.

Group C 
Although initially planned to take place on 25–30 October, the games were rescheduled to 28–30 October. Hawassa City from Ethiopia withdrew.

The games of Group C were schedules to be hosted in Kampala, Uganda, but were pulled from the country because of the 2022 Uganda Ebola outbreak. Dar es Salaam in Tanzania was announced as the new venue.

Group D 
The games of Group D were held in Antananarivo, Madagascar, and are played from 18 to 23 October.
Dekedaha from Somalia and Foxes from Zimbabwe withdrew, leaving four teams in the group. One day before the start, Roche-Bois Warriors from Mauritius withdrew as well.

Elite 16 
In the elite 16, the eight teams from the first round are joined by six teams that qualified in the 2022 qualification. The NBA Academy Africa and Elan Coton joined as wild cards.

Draw 
The draw was held on 3 November 2022 on Abidjan.

West Division 
The games of the East Division are held in Abidjan, Ivory Coast, and are played from 15 to 20 November.

Group A

Group B

Final round

Semi-finals

Third place game

Final

East Division 
The games of the East Division are held in Ellis Park Arena in Johannesburg, South Africa, and are played from 22 to 27 November. Initially, it was announcned that games would be held in Cape Town.

Group A 
The games played by the NBA Academy Africa are not scored and are ineligible to qualify for the next round; however, games against the team will be used for their opponents' standings.

Group B 
Matero Magic from Zambia were given a wild card to join Group B, after Cobra Sport from South Sudan withdrew.

Final round

Semi-finals

Third place game

Final

Statistics

Individual statistic leaders
Note: statistics from six games in Group A, as well as two games in the final round of the Eltie 16 East Division are missing.

Individual game highs

References 

2023 Q
Qualifiers
2023 in African basketball
2022–23 in basketball leagues